State Highway 26 (SH 26) is a State Highway in Kerala, India that starts in Nattukal and ends in Velanthavalam. The highway is 11.6 km long.

The Route Map 
Nattukal junction - Palakkad - Pollachi road - Velanthavalam junction - road continues to Tamil Nadu

See also 
Roads in Kerala
List of State Highways in Kerala

References 

State Highways in Kerala
Roads in Palakkad district